This is a list of Croatian television related events from 1979.

Events

Debuts

Television shows

Ending this year

Births
5 June - Antonija Šola, singer-songwriter & actress
18 July - Zrinka Cvitešić, actress
22 August - Leona Paraminski, actress and TV host
27 August - Ana Begić, actress
4 September - Kristina Krepela, actress
2 October - Antonija Blaće, TV host

Deaths